Thiyagasamudram is a village in the Papanasam taluk of Thanjavur district, Tamil Nadu, India.

Demographics 

As per the 2001 census, Thiyagasamudram had a total population of 2745 with 1381 males and 1364 females. The sex ratio was 1988. The literacy rate was 65.32.

References 

 

Villages in Thanjavur district